Mir Ali Tehsil is a subdivision located in North Waziristan district, Khyber Pakhtunkhwa, Pakistan. The population is 185,525 according to the 2017 census.

Localities 

Hurmaz
Mirali
 Mubarak Shahi

Notable people
Mirzali Khan
Tahir Dawar
Noor Islam Dawar

See also 
 List of tehsils of Khyber Pakhtunkhwa

References 

Tehsils of Khyber Pakhtunkhwa
Populated places in North Waziristan